Curtain forces were military forces created soon after signing of the Treaty of Brest-Litovsk by Soviet Russia in 1918 to protect the inner regions of the state and initially served as border troops. They were created by the directive No.72 of Higher Military Council on March 5, 1918.

History
The Curtain was a defense system created according to the March 5, 1918 directive of the Revolutionary Military Council to guard "the interior regions of the state against possible invasion of Germans" and for guarding the demarcation line established by the Brest Peace Treaty. It was composed of groups of military forces that were organized on a voluntary basis. The Russian Army officers developed the concept of the Curtain during its efforts to defend Petrograd against the February 1918 German offensive initiated by Erich Ludendorff.  The Curtain was deployed during the period marked by the collapse of the former Imperial Russian Army and the Red Army was just being formed. After initial German successes, in early March a mixture of Red Guards, Red Army, volunteer and partisan forces stabilized the line along the Narva and Dnieper rivers; they formed the beginning of the Curtain. The Western and Northern curtains were established in places of the former Russian Empire's Western and Northern Fronts, respectively.

Western Curtain
The Western Curtain (official name: Western Region of Curtain Forces) was established on March 29, 1918, according to the March 5 directive of the Supreme Military Council. It stretched from Nevel to Novy Oskol, to protect Moscow, under the command of V.N. Yegoryev.

Northern Curtain

Northeastern Curtain
The Northeastern Region of Curtain Forces (Сев.-Вост. участок отрядов завесы) was created by the August 6, 1918 directive of the Supreme Military Council.

Southern Curtain
The Southern Region of Curtain Forces was created by the August 11, 1918 directive of the Supreme Military Council.

Disbanding
The Curtain was disbanded by a September 11, 1918 Decree of the Revolutionary Military Council, which established Fronts, as well as the Western Defense Region in place of it.

References 

Military units and formations of the Soviet Union
Russian Civil War
Soviet Russia in World War I
Military units and formations of Russia